Bill or William Otto may refer to:

 Bill Otto (entrepreneur), founder of Otto Laboratories and Otto Aviation Group
 Bill Otto (Kansas politician), Republican member of the Kansas House of Representatives from 2005 to 2012
 Bill Otto (Missouri politician) (born 1956), Democratic member of the Missouri House of Representatives from 2013 to 2017
 William Tod Otto (1816–1905), American judge and reporter of decisions of the United States Supreme Court